Anna Catherine Southall  (born 9 June 1948) served as Director of the National Museum Wales from 1998 to 2002.

She was educated at The Mount School, York and the University of East Anglia (BA, 1970). She was Vice Chairman of the Big Lottery Fund from 2006 to 2014.

References

1948 births
Living people
People educated at The Mount School, York
Alumni of the University of East Anglia
People associated with Amgueddfa Cymru – Museum Wales
Directors of museums in the United Kingdom
Women museum directors
Officers of the Order of the British Empire
British women curators